Bret David Hoffmann (February 8, 1967 – July 7, 2018) was an American death metal vocalist. He fronted Fire for Effect, Resthaven, and South of Resthaven and was a former member of Malevolent Creation and Down the Drain. Hoffmann performed on the first three Malevolent Creation releases until he left the band after 1993's Stillborn album. He then returned, and performed on The Fine Art of Murder and Envenomed before leaving again and being replaced by Kyle Symons.

In 2005, he returned again and replaced Symons. He returned to Malevolent again in 2006 for touring purposes and appears on Malevolent Creation's tenth, Doomsday X, 11th Invidious Dominion, and 12th album, Dead Man's Path.

On July 7, 2018, Hoffmann died from colorectal cancer at the age of 51.

References

1967 births
2018 deaths
People from North Tonawanda, New York
Singers from New York (state)
Death metal musicians